Andrew Dykes may refer to:

 Andrew Dykes (cricketer) (born 1971), Tasmanian cricketer
 Andrew Dykes (rugby union), Scotland rugby player